The yellow-eyed starling (Aplonis mystacea) is a species of starling in the family Sturnidae. It is found in Indonesia and Papua New Guinea. Its natural habitat is subtropical or tropical moist lowland forests. It is threatened by habitat loss.

References

yellow-eyed starling
Birds of Papua New Guinea
yellow-eyed starling
Taxonomy articles created by Polbot